InCreo Interactive Creations AS (InCreo in short) is a Norwegian software corporation founded in 2000 with headquarters in Trondheim and departments in Oslo and Bodø.  InCreo primarily develops custom software for corporate or governmental websites. InCreo has developed their own CMS, the InCreo CMS.

History
Bjørviks webdesign was founded by Hallgrim Bjørvik in 1997. This company was in 2000 converted to an employee-owned company. In 2004, the department in Bodø opened, and the Oslo department opened in 2009. In the start, the company focused on Internet hosting services, the later years the main focus has been on developing web sites, webdesign and webshops.

During the last tree years, InCreo has been credited for their work in the Norwegian Gulltaggen competition 

 a reward for web design and web sites.

Technology
InCreo's software and CMS is based on the Microsoft ASP.NET platform.

Services
Its service offerings include: 
 IT Consulting 
 Webdesign
 Internet hosting services
 Application Development
 Application Management

References

Employee-owned companies
Software companies of Norway
Computer companies of Norway
Companies established in 2000